Mokry Dwór is a village in the administrative district of Gmina Pruszcz Gdański, within Gdańsk County, Pomeranian Voivodeship, in northern Poland.

Nassenhuben, earlier also called Nassenhof was a small estate in Prussia. A church was first established in 1632. The pastors at Nassenhuben church had their parish house in the adjacent estate named Hochzeit.

For details of the history of the region, see History of Pomerania.

The village has a population of 218.

People born in Mokry Dwór (Nassenhuben) 
Daniel Ernst Jablonski (1660-1741), theologian
Georg Forster (1754-1794), born in Hochzeit (Nassenhuben) naturalist and revolutionary

References

Villages in Gdańsk County